Rinaldo Agazzi (Mapello, Province of Bergamo, October 30, 1857 – Bergamo, May 24, 1939) was an Italian painter of landscapes and portraits.

Biography
In 1879 along with Giovanni Cavalleri, he was awarded a stipend to study in Rome, where he frequented the Accademia Libera of Cesare Maccari. He was resident in Bergamo. In 1888, he exhibited at Bologna: Giornata serena; Gli schiavi bianchi; and Il calzolaio. At the Exhibition of Turin of 1884, he exhibited: Pensieri allegri; Casa rustica, and two landscapes. He also painted portraits.

In 1879, his exhibit called "A Bread in Two" won a prize at an exhibition in Carrara. While he was in the Accademia Libera he became acquainted with numerous realist painters of the time, including Giacomo Favretto, Luigi Nono, Ettore Tito, Vincenzo Irolli and others. This influence of realism in his work remained under the latter stages of his career, when he began painting portraits and idyllic subjects.

His brother was the painter Ermenegildo Agazzi (1866 –1945). He was a pupil of Enrico Scuri at the Accademia Carrara of Bergamo. He painted in the Realist style of Cesare Tallone.

Later in life, he exhibited at the World Exposition in Paris and the International Exposition in Barcelona. He was invited to the Biennale of Munich in 1905 and 1909 and to the Venice Biennale in 1920. In 1895, he helped found the artist's association in Bergamo: Circolo “Palma il Vecchio”. In 1927 he had a personal exhibition in Bergamo.

References

1857 births
1939 deaths
19th-century Italian painters
Italian male painters
20th-century Italian painters
Painters from Bergamo
19th-century Italian male artists
20th-century Italian male artists